Ignite is a melodic hardcore band from Orange County, California. Formed in 1993, their commercial breakthrough album, A Place Called Home, was released in 2000 on TVT Records. Prior to this release, they were well regarded among hardcore fans, thanks in part to constant touring and having visited over 40 countries.

Much of the band's music is socially and politically aware. Ignite actively supports, and has given proceeds to, organizations such as Earth First, Doctors Without Borders, Sea Shepherd, and Pacific Wildlife. Former lead singer Zoltán "Zoli" Téglás has taken account of such issues as environmental concerns and vegetarianism—common topics found on A Place Called Home. The legacy of Soviet Communism in Eastern Europe is another recurring theme, in part because of Teglas' Hungarian background.

History 

On May 9, 2005, they filmed a live DVD at The Troubadour with A Dying Dream and Eightyonedays in West Hollywood, California. The DVD was never released due to some technical problems with the quality, but on April 20, 2008, they gathered footage for an upcoming live DVD of their show in Leipzig, Germany.

On July 20, 2005, a deal was announced with Abacus Recordings, a subsidiary label of Century Media Records; the band's album Our Darkest Days was released on the label in May 2006.

The band toured in Europe in 2008. They headlined shows at Persistence Tour 2009. The Pennywise website, on February 16, 2010, announced that frontman Zoli Téglás just recently joined Pennywise.

The band eventually began touring with Zoli in 2014, and began recording the fifth album A War Against You.

On November 24, 2019, Zoli Teglas stated through a social media post that he will be leaving Ignite in 2020 after their remaining scheduled shows. Teglas has fronted the band since 1994.

On September 17, 2021, they released a new EP with a new singer Eli Santana (of Holy Grail) featuring two songs, "Anti Complicity Anthem" and "Turn XXI".

Members

Current members 
 Kevin Kilkenny (2000–2003, 2006–present) – guitar
 Nik Hill (2000, 2003, 2005–2015, 2018–present) – guitar
 Brett Rasmussen (1993–present) – bass
 Craig Anderson (1997–present) – drums
 Eli Santana (2021–present) – vocals

Previous members 
 Zoli Téglás (1994–2020) – vocals
 Joe Nelson (1993–1994) – vocals
 Randy Johnson (1994) – vocals
 Brian Balchack (1998–2000, 2005–2019) – guitar
 Joe Foster (1993–1998) – guitar
 Gavin Oglesby (1993–1994) – guitar
 Casey Jones (1993–1997) – drums

Timeline

Discography

Studio albums 
 Scarred for Life (1994) Lost & Found Records
 Family (1995) Lost & Found Records (Europe version of Call On My Brothers)
Call On My Brothers (1995) Conversion Records
 A Place Called Home (2000) TVT Records
 Our Darkest Days (2006) Abacus Recordings (US), Century Media Records (Europe)
 A War Against You (2016) Century Media Records
Ignite (2022) Century Media Records

Other releases 
 Where They Talk EP (1994) Ringside Records
 Slapshot / Ignite split (1994) Lost & Found Records
 Battery / Ignite split (1994) Lost & Found Records
 In My Time EP (1995) Lost & Found Records
 Ignite / Good Riddance split (1996) Revelation Records
 Past Our Means EP (1996) Revelation Records
 Straight Ahead (1997) Rovers Records
 Ignite / X-Acto split (1997) Ataque Sonoro Records
 Sea Shepherd Conservation Society EP (1999) Vacation House Records

Compilation appearances 
Punk Bites (1996) Fearless Records
 Guilty by Association (1995)
West Coast vs. East Coast Hardcore (1995)
As The Sun Sets... (1999) The Association Of Welterweights
Never Give In: A Tribute to Bad Brains (1999) Century Media Records
Punk Chunks Vol. 2 (2002) Lameass Recordz
Revelation 100: A Fifteen Year Retrospective of Rare Recordings (2002) Revelation Records
The Worldwide Tribute to the Real Oi Vol. 2 (2002) I Scream/Knockout/Triple Crown
Our Impact Will Be Felt (2007) Abacus Recordings

References

External links 

 
 
 Century Media band page
 Revelation Records band page
 Ignite on Discogs

Hardcore punk groups from California
Musical groups from Orange County, California
Revelation Records artists
Musical groups established in 1993
1993 establishments in California
Melodic hardcore musical groups from California
TVT Records artists
Century Media Records artists
Superball Music artists
Abacus Recordings artists